Vengeance is a 1968 Spaghetti Western film written and directed by Anthony Dawson. It starred Richard Harrison, Mariangela Giordano and Luciano Pigozzi.

Plot 
Joko, Richie, Domingo and Mendoza hatch a plan to steal gold from bandits. Domingo, however, betrays them by revealing the attempted theft to the bandits. Joko, Ricky and Mendoza are thus discovered during the robbery: Mendoza dies while trying to cover the escape of his friends. Ricky escapes with the gold but is captured by 5 bandits and tortured in an attempt to be revealed where he was to meet with Joko.

When the bandits understand that Ricky won't speak, they dismember him by tying his limbs with ropes to horses. Joko thus begins his personal war to avenge his dead comrades and first kills Domingo, the traitor, and then sets off in search of the 5 bandits who killed Ricky: to each bandit, before killing him, Joko throws a piece of bloodied rope collected. from those used to dismember Ricky. Joko, however, knows only 4 of the 5 bandits: the discovery of the identity of the last one will reserve him a bitter surprise. During the hunt for the assassins, Joko will also have to understand the role of a mysterious detective who follows him like a shadow in all his movements.

Cast 
 Richard Harrison as Jokko Barrat
 Claudio Camaso as Mendoza
 Špela Rozin as Jane (credited as Sheyla Rosin)
 Guido Lollobrigida  as (credited as Lee Burton)
 Werner Pochath  as Kid
 Paolo Gozlino as Pinkerton Detective Lester (credited as Paul Lino)
 Alberto Dell'Acqua as Richie
 Ignazio Spalla as  Laredo
 Mariangela Giordano  as Rosita
 Goffredo Unger as  Yuma
 Luciano Pigozzi as  Domingo

Release
Vengeance was released in 1968.

Reception
In a contemporary review, the Monthly Film Bulletin noted that Vengeance had a "strange and colourful Gothic flavour, marred only by a hero clearly turned out on the Italian assembly line of faceless Clint Eastwood substitutes." The review also noted an "engagingly baroque villain" while "The plot, admittedly, allows Margheriti to do little but dress up proceedings and make the action as taut as possible;" The review concluded that "Margheriti's visual panache and ingenuity lift Vengeance out of the Italian Western rut and lend it a flavour more commonly associated with Bava or Freda."

References

Sources

External links 

1968 films
1968 Western (genre) films
Spaghetti Western films
West German films
German Western (genre) films
Films directed by Antonio Margheriti
Films scored by Carlo Savina
Films shot in Almería
1960s Italian films
1960s German films